Sahar El Hawari was a promoter of Women's football in Egypt. Sahar El Hawari became the first female member of the Egyptian Football Federation, the first women's referee in Africa, and a member of FIFA.

References

1958 births
Living people
Egyptian football referees
International Olympic Committee members
FIFA officials
Sports executives and administrators
Members of the Parliament of Egypt